Splicing factor U2AF 65 kDa subunit is a protein that in humans is encoded by the U2AF2 gene.

Function 

In eukaryotes, the introns in the transcribed pre-mRNA first have to be removed by spliceosome in order to form a mature mRNA. A spliceosome is assembled from small nuclear ribonucleoproteins(snRNP) and small nuclear RNAs(snRNA). And the splicing factor can be divided into snRNP and non snRNP proteins.U2 auxiliary factor (U2AF), composed of a large and a small subunit, is a non-snRNP protein required for the binding of U2 snRNP to the pre-mRNA branch site. This gene encodes the U2AF large subunit, which contains a sequence-specific RNA-binding region with 3 RNA recognition motifs and an Arg/Ser-rich domain necessary for splicing. The large subunit binds to the polypyrimidine tract of introns early during spliceosome assembly. Multiple alternatively spliced transcript variants have been detected for this gene, but the full-length natures of only two have been determined to date.

In humans and other tetrapods, it has been shown that without U2AF2, the splicing process is inhibited. However, in zebrafish and other teleosts the RNA splicing process can still occur on certain genes in the absence of U2AF2. This may be because 10% of genes have alternating TG and AC base pairs at the 3' splice site (3'ss) and 5' splice site (5'ss) respectively on each intron, which alters the secondary structure of the RNA and influences splicing.

The splicing factor U2AF65 can specifically recognizes the polypyrimidine tract (Py tract), that’s because U2AF65 consists of 3 RNA binding domains (RRMs), all of them have a high binding affinity to the Py tract on its adjacent 3’ splice site. The RRM1 and RRM2 are sufficient for specific RNA/protein binding, while RRM3 is responsible for protein/protein interactions. For example, the C-Terminal RRM3 contribute to establish protein–protein contacts with splicing factors like UAP56, SAP155, and mBBP/SF1.

Interactions 

U2AF2 has been shown to interact with:

 PUF60, 
 SF1, 
 SFRS11,
 SFRS2IP, 
 SRPK2, 
 U2 small nuclear RNA auxiliary factor 1  and
 WT1.

References

Further reading